Crestview Park is a small neighborhood park in North Little Rock, Arkansas.  It is roughly bounded by Cherry Hill Drive, Crestview Drive, and the westbound onramp to Interstate 40 from Arkansas Highway 107.  The park, set on a steeply sloping parcel, has no major amenities, and was established for passive recreational uses of the nearby population.  The park is notable for the presence of two naturalistic sculptures by Dionicio Rodriguez that were installed .  One is a footbridge that appears to have been fashioned out of a fallen tree, and the other is rustic shelter, one of Rodriguez' more unusual works.

The artwork within the park was listed on the National Register of Historic Places in 1986.

See also
National Register of Historic Places listings in Pulaski County, Arkansas

References

Parks on the National Register of Historic Places in Arkansas
Buildings and structures completed in 1933
North Little Rock, Arkansas
Parks in Arkansas
Protected areas of Pulaski County, Arkansas
National Register of Historic Places in Pulaski County, Arkansas
Historic district contributing properties in Arkansas